HD 115404 is a binary star system located in the constellation Coma Berenices. Parallax measurements made by Hipparcos put the system at 36 light-years, or 11 parsecs, away. The combined apparent magnitude of the system is 6.52, with the magnitudes of the components being 6.66 and 9.50.

The primary component, designated A, is a K-type main sequence star. It is about 70% as massive as the Sun, and is 0.76 times as wide. Its companion is a red dwarf (M0.5 V). It has 54.2% the mass of the Sun, and is 0.55 times as wide. The two stars orbit each other every 770 years, and are separated by about 8. The system is thought to be fairly old, at 5.4 to 13.5 billion years old.

In 2022, two exoplanets, Neptunian and super-Jovian in mass, were discovered in orbit around the primary star using a combination of radial velocity and astrometry.

References 

Coma Berenices
Durchmusterung objects
0505
115404
064797
K-type main-sequence stars
M-type main-sequence stars
Solar-type stars
Binary stars